The 2018–19 Premier League of Eswatini was the 2018–19 season of the Premier League of Eswatini, the top-tier football league in Eswatini (formerly Swaziland), since its establishment in 1971. The season started on 14 September 2018.

League table

References

Football leagues in Eswatini
Premier League
Premier League
Eswatini